Hessler is a surname. Notable people with the surname include:
Alexander Hessler (1823-1895), American photographer
Cort Hessler, American assistant director and stuntman
Georg Hessler (1427–1482), German Roman Catholic cardinal and bishop
Gerd Hessler (born 1948), German cross country skier
Gordon Hessler (1925–2014), British film and television director
Hans-Joachim Hessler (born 1968), German composer, musician and musicologist
Pauline Heßler (born 1998), German ski jumper
Peter Hessler (born 1969), American writer and journalist
Rowe Hessler (born 1991), American speedcuber
Vanessa Hessler (born 1988), American-Italian model and actress

See also
Hessler Peak, sharp peak in the Heritage Range in Antarctica
Hessler Road, in Cleveland, Ohio, United States